Jan Wiktor Tomasz Zawidzki (December 20, 1866 in Włóki, Masovian Voivodeship – September 14, 1928 in Warsaw) was a Polish physical chemist and historian of chemistry. He researched mainly chemical kinetics, thermochemistry and autocatalysis.

Zawidzki was a professor of the Akademia Rolnicza in Dublany (1907–1916), Jagiellonian University (1916–1917), University of Warsaw (1917–1928), rector of the University of Warsaw (1918–1919), member of the Academy of Learning (since 1918), co-founder of the Polish Chemical Society and magazine Roczniki Chemii.

Bibliography
 Kinetyka chemiczna (1931)
 Chemia nieorganiczna vol. 1–2 (1932–1936)

References
 
 

1866 births
1928 deaths
Historians of science
Academic staff of Jagiellonian University
Polish physical chemists
20th-century Polish historians
Polish male non-fiction writers